The Port of Stockton is a major deepwater port on the Stockton Ship Channel of the Pacific Ocean and an inland port located more than seventy nautical miles from the ocean, in Stockton, California on the Stockton Channel and San Joaquin River-Stockton Deepwater Shipping Channel (before it joins the Sacramento River to empty into Suisun Bay). It is governed by a commission appointed by the City of Stockton and San Joaquin County. In 2012 it employed 4,500 people and made about $4.9 million in local tax funds.

Geography 
The only natural outlet for the waters of the Central Valley to pass into the sea is through the narrow Carquinez Strait, at the inland eastern extreme of San Pablo Bay. Further inland are the Suisun and Grizzly Bays, arms of the Pacific Ocean deep in the Californian interior. Further inland again from these last bays is the broad Sacramento–San Joaquin River Delta, formed where the San Joaquin and Sacramento Rivers meet and cross together. This verdant triangle of land with deep black soils is at the heart of the Central Valley and stretches some fifty miles from Suisun Bay on the west to the cities of Stockton and Sacramento on the east.

Pollution 
The California Office of Environmental Health Hazard Assessment issued advice in 2007, based on high levels of PCBs, that no one should eat any fish or shellfish from the Port of Stockton.

History 

In 1846, the first cargo boat ascended the San Joaquin River. In 1848, John Doak established the first ferry service on the river, and the first freight vessel, the sloop Maria, visited Stockton. In 1849, Doak brought lumber from San Francisco to Stockton and began a lumber business. By the 1850s, the port had become a center of commodity shipping and the supply center for the California goldfields. By the 1860s, the region saw a decline in gold production and an increase in agriculture.

The first dredging contracts for the Stockton Deepwater Channel were awarded in 1930. The Port District officially opened on February 2, 1933, when the ship Daisy Grey arrived bringing lumber from Oregon.

During World War II, when an attack on coastal California seemed likely, the U.S. War Department requested some ships be built at an inland port, so many new ships were built at the Port of Stockton area.

Port management recognized the increasing importance of containerized cargo and upgraded dock side facilities. The ship channel was improved in order to accommodate large Panamax class ships.

The Navy Rough and Ready Island Naval Supply Depot built during World War II was phased out of use as a result of special federal legislation sponsored by U.S. Sen. Dianne Feinstein (D-CA) in 1995. It was transferred to the port between 2000 and 2003. This area of the port is now known as the "West Complex".

Port services

 The Port is a Foreign Trade Zone.
 The port has two 140-ton mobile harbor cranes.
 The port handles both large volume of bulk cargo and breakbulk cargo shipments.
 The port is served by three railroads: Central California Traction Company handles local rail shipments while Union Pacific (UP) and Burlington Northern Santa Fe (BNSF) provide rail connections to the rest of North America. Port of Stockton has 75 miles of rail lines shipping over 2,090,400 short tons a year.
 The port is serviced by Interstate 5, California State Route 4, and California State Route 99. Over 200 truck companies serve the Port. Interstate 80 is about 50 miles north of the port.
 The port is part of the California’s Green Trade Corridor Marine Highway project, as ships move cargo much greener than trucks and trains. Green Trade Corridor Marine Highway (ports of Oakland-Stockton-West Sacramento) can improve goods movement through Northern California.

References

Bibliography
Stockton Rough & Ready Island redevelopment project
portofstockton.com 2005 Annual Report

External links
 

Stockton, California
Stockton
River ports of the United States
San Joaquin River
San Joaquin Valley
Geography of Stockton, California
Geography of San Joaquin County, California
Economy of Stockton, California
Stockton